Simon de Cordes (born around 1559 – died 11 November 1599) was a Dutch merchant and explorer who after the death of Admiral Jacques Mahu, became leader of an expedition with the goal to achieve the Indies, which was replaced for Chile, Peru and other kingdoms (in New Spain: Nueva Galicia; Captaincy General of Guatemala ; Nueva Vizcaya; New Kingdom of León and Santa Fe de Nuevo México). The fleet's original mission was to sail along the west coast of South America, where they would sell their cargo for silver, gold or pearls and to head for Japan only if the first mission failed. In that case, they were supposed to obtain silver in Japan and to buy spices in the Moluccas, before heading back to Europe around Cape of Good Hope. Their goal was to sail through the Strait of Magellan to get to their destiny, which scared many sailors because of the harsh weather conditions. The first major expedition around South America was organized by a voorcompagnie, the Magelhaen Company. It organized two fleets of five and four ships with 750 sailors  and soldiers to "devaluate the Spanish". It resulted in utter disaster, 80% of the men died during the journey and the investors made no profit. No full account of the voyage is in existence, but details can be gathered from an unofficial journal kept by Potgieter, a surgeon, letters from William Adams (pilot) and from the facts gleaned by Oliver Van Noort's squadron.

Background
Dutch and English ships were not allowed in Cádiz, Seville and Lisbon since 1585. To trade one needed Spanish dollars or silver, accepted all over the world. To obtain silver they had to get as close as possible to Argentina, Peru, Potosí, Bolivia (the location of the Spanish colonial silver mint), Mexico or Japan. In 1596, the peak year of silver production in Spanish America, the total silver export was valued at around 7,000,000 pesos, of which the royal family gained only 1,550,000, the rest going to the Casa de Contratación and the Consulado. In 1596 a combined English/Dutch fleet sacked Cádiz. Its primary objective was seizing the Spanish treasure fleet. The raid contributed to Spain's declaration of bankruptcy in the next year after Spain organized a 3rd Armada. With the death of King Philip II in 1598 Spain was no longer regarded as a superpower.

In 1598 several Dutch merchants organized a fleet to sail to South America to trade and attack their enemy. Each ship had six (English) musicians and 60 soldiers, arms, gunpowder and bricks to build a stronghold. Several Dutch cities supplied guns and munition. Also spare parts to build a small ship, but no life cattle, only salted meat, besides several kinds of grain and beans. The ships with their initial captains were:
 The "Hope" (Hoop) with Jacques Mahu (1564–1598) as admiral; this ship was lost near Hawaiian Islands;
 The "Love" (Liefde) with Simon de Cordes, as vice admiral, who had taken his son with him and William Adams as his chief navigator; this ship reached Bungo, Japan;
 The "Loyalty" (Trouw) with Jurriaen van Boekhout, (Dordrecht, ca 1569–1599); this ship was captured in Tidore;
 The "Faith" (Geloof) with Gerrit van Beuningen (Emden, ca 1565–1599), who had been in Asia with Cornelis de Houtman, but did not see much as he was kept as prisoner and not allowed to go ashore; the "Faith" came back to Rotterdam;
 The "Good Tiding" (Blijde boodschap), a scout, with Sebald de Weert, was seized near Valparaíso.

Pieter van der Hagen from Middelburg and Johan van der Veeken from Rotterdam, hired not only Mahu, de Cordes but also Olivier van Noort, a local innkeeper. He left Rotterdam one week later, on 2 July 1598 with four ships and about 250 men and a plan to attack Spanish possessions (ships) in the Pacific and to trade with China and the Spice Islands after thirty years of war between the Netherlands, Spain and Portugal.

On the Atlantic

After leaving Goeree and Brielle on 27 Juni 1598 the ships sailed to the Channel, but anchored in the Downs till mid July. When the ships approached the shores of North Africa Simon de Cordes realized he had been far too generous in the early weeks of the voyage and instituted an 'bread policy'. At the end of August they landed on Santiago, Cape Verde and on 1 September on Mayo off the coast of Africa because of a lack of water and need for fresh fruit. Near Praia they succeeded to occupy a Portuguese castle on the top of a hill, but came back without anything substantial. At Brava, Cape Verde half of the crew of the "Hope" caught fever, among them Admiral Jacques Mahu.  After his death the leadership of the expedition was taken over by Simon de Cordes, with Van Beuningen as vice admiral. Because of contrary wind the fleet was blown off course (NE in the opposite direction) and arrived at Cape Lopez, Gabon, Central Africa, early November. An outbreak of scurvy forced a landing on Annobón, on 16 December. Eighty men were sick because of fever or dysentery.  They put all the sick ashore until they were recovered and left early January.  Because of starvation the men fell into great weakness; some tried to eat leather. On 10 March 1599 they reached the Rio de la Plata, in Argentina. Early April they arrived at the Strait, 570 km long, 2 km wide at its narrowest point, with an inaccurate chart of the seabed. The wind turned out to be unfavorable and this remained so for the next four months. In August all the men went ashore. Under freezing temperatures and poor visibility they caught magellanic penguins, seals, mussels, petrels and fish. On 23 August the weather improved, after three weeks of snow and storm.

On the Pacific

When finally the Pacific Ocean was reached on 3 September 1599, the ships were caught in another storm and lost sight of each other in a fog. On 7 September the "Loyalty" and the "Faith" were drifted back in the strait, and were able to stay together for three months. They got separated 11 December.  Two weeks later the expedition of Olivier van Noort appeared and the "Faith" was repaired. On 8 January 1600, Sebald de Weert tried to leave with Van Noort but his ships were faster. Around Christmas the crew of the "Faith" got enough of the voyage and mutiny threatened because of a lack of bread, wine and water. At the eastern end of the Strait De Weert was forced to return to Netherlands. On 24 January he discovered the Sebald Islands, now known as the Jason Islands (NW of the Falkland Islands). After 25 months it arrived in Rotterdam. He brought plants and herbs for the botanist Clusius.
 The "Hope" (Hoop) with Admiral Simon de Cordes, who died on 11 November 1599 on Mocha Island. He was probably succeeded by his son, who also spoke Portuguese. This ship got lost crossing the Pacific;
 The "Love" (Liefde) with Gerrit van Beuningen, as vice admiral, who died on 7 November 1599, supposedly at Punta de Lavapié. He was succeeded by Jacob Quaeckernaeck who arrived in Japan together with William Adams;
 The "Loyalty" (Trouw) with Baltazar de Cordes, who died 5 January 1601 on Tidore;
 The "Good Tiding" (Blijde Boodschap), a yacht with the experienced Dirck Gerritsz Pomp, who was arrested in Valparaíso.

Simon de Cordes ordered his small fleet to wait two months for each other on Santa María Island, Chile, but some ships missed the island because of a mistake on the map. From here the story becomes less reliable because of a lack of sources. Early November the "Hope" landed on Mocha Island where 27 people were killed by the people from Araucania. (In the account given to Van Noort it was said that Simon der Cordes was slain at the Punta de Lavapie, but Adams gives Mocha Island as the scene of his death.) The "Love" hit the island, but went on to Arauco, Chile. A Spanish captain supplied the "Loyalty" and "Hope" with food; the Dutch helped him against the Araucans, who had killed 23 Dutch, including Gerrit van Beuningen, who was replaced by Jacob Quaeckernaeck.

In March Baltazar de Cordes, who had succeeded Van Boekhout and had lost the "Faith", landed on Chiloé, an island near the coast. There they ate sheep meat, potatoes, eggs, and were given apples and honey. He ordered to built a small fortification. The Dutch received aid from the Cunco or Huilliche people in Lacuy and made an alliance to seize Castro and finish off the Spanish at end of the conquest of Chile and involved in the Arauco War. The "Loyalty" then crossed the Pacific Ocean to Tidore, where it arrived on 5 January 1601. The Portuguese promised to bring food on the next day. Then most of the crew, 24 people, were killed. The five survivors on board were captured and taken to Goa.

The "Good Tiding", under Dirck Gerritsz Pomp, drifted for many weeks without sail before it landed near Valparaíso on 17 November. The detained crew were taken 3,000 km north to Callao de Lima (Peru) and questioned. Pomp, who spoke Portuguese, and had visited Japan told them it was their intention to sell the cargo (cloth, beads, weapons) for silver in Japan, and to buy spices for that silver in the Moluccas. He was seen as dangerous and taken to Panama and then Lisbon. In 1604 Pomp was exchanged for Almirante de Aragon.

The "Hope" and "Love" lost a large part of the crew in battles with Araucans (who presumably thought the Dutch were Spanish) and then decided to leave for Japan on 27 November 1599. The "Hope" was lost in a heavy storm, but the "Love", with Quaeckernaeck and Adams reached Bungo in Japan, on 19 April 1600 with 24 people. Only five men were able to walk.

On 4 December 1602 a notary left Isaac le Maire, his brother Salomon, Balthasar Coymans (1555–1634) and others a deed as four ships were not yet back, ordering the insurers to cash out.

References

Sources
 DE REIS VAN MAHU EN DE CORDES DOOR DE STRAAT VAN MAGALHAES NAAR ZUID-AMERIKA EN JAPAN 1598–1600. SCHEEPSJOURNAAL, RAPPORTEN, BRIEVEN, ZEILAANWIJZINGEN, KAARTEN, ENZ. UITGEGEVEN EN TOEGELICHT door F.C. WIEDER (1923) 
 WIJDTLOOPIGH VERHAEL van 't gene de vijf schepen door de Straet Magellana wedervaren door Barent Jansz. Potgieter, chirurgijn (1600) published by Zacharias Heyns
 De Boer, M.G. (1912) Van Oude Voyagiën
 Sluiter, E. (1933) The voyage of Jacques Mahu and Simon de Cordes into the Pacific Ocean, 1598–1600. Thesis/dissertation.
 Burney, J. (2010). "Voyage of Five Ships of Rotterdam, under the command of Jacob Mahu and Simon de Cordes, to the South Sea". In A Chronological History of the Discoveries in the South Sea or Pacific Ocean (Cambridge Library Collection – Maritime Exploration, pp. 186–204). Cambridge: Cambridge University Press. doi:10.1017/CBO9780511783722.013

16th-century Dutch explorers
1598 deaths
Explorers of South America
Year of birth unknown
Year of birth uncertain